Ellison Onizuka Kona International Airport at Keāhole  is the busiest airport on the Island of Hawaii. It is located in Kalaoa CDP, Hawaii County, Hawaii, United States, near the town of Kailua-Kona. The airport serves leeward (western) Hawaii island, including the resorts of the North Kona and South Kohala districts. It is one of two international airports serving Hawaii island, the other being Hilo International Airport on the windward side.

It is included in the Federal Aviation Administration (FAA) National Plan of Integrated Airport Systems for 2021–2025, in which it is categorized as a small-hub primary commercial service facility.

History

Construction 
Much of the runway is built on a relatively recent lava flow: the 1801 Huehue flow from Hualālai.
and creating Keāhole Point. The airport opened on July 1, 1970, with a single  runway; the previous smaller airstrip was converted into the Old Kona Airport State Recreation Area.

Construction crews from Bechtel Corporation used three million pounds of dynamite to flatten the lava tube riddled lava flow within 13 months.

In its first full year, 515,378 passengers passed through the new open-air tropical-style terminals.

The airport has had several names over its lifetime. At the time of its opening, it was named the Ke-āhole Airport, after its geographical location, Keāhole Point, itself named after the āhole fish found in the area. In 1993, the airport was renamed Keāhole-Kona International Airport, after the nearby resort town of Kona. In 1997, the Kona name was further emphasized when the airport was renamed the Kona International Airport at Keāhole. On January 8, 2017, the airport was renamed Ellison Onizuka Kona International Airport at Keāhole to honor astronaut Ellison Onizuka who was born and raised in Kona and died in the Space Shuttle Challenger disaster.

Impact 
Prior to the construction of the new airport in 1970, tourism was centered on the town of Hilo on the eastern side of the Big Island. Tourists to Kona and the western side of the island typically flew into the Hilo Airport and had to make nearly two hour drive across the island. The lack of a major airport became especially problematic as large resorts started opening in Kona around 1968.

When the airport opened, it helped accelerate a shift of tourism from East Hawaii to West Hawaii. Tourism in Hilo had already taken a hit when a tsunami destroyed all seaside hotels in 1960.

The full extent of the airport's impact and shift in tourism can be seen in Hawaii Island Strategic Plan for 2006 to 2015. By 2005 the percentage of accommodations on the west side of the island increased to 86% of the total. In 2005, just four modest hotels continued to serve the east side of the Big Island, with three of them dating back to the 1960s.

Tourism has helped fuel Hawaii County's overall population growth. Between 1990 and 2010, the population increased 48%.

Expansion 
Aloha Airlines and Hawaiian Airlines were the primary air carriers during the early and mid-1970s for inter-island flights from Honolulu on Oahu, Kahului on Maui and Lihue on Kauai with Aloha operating Boeing 737-200 jets and Hawaiian operating McDonnell Douglas DC-9-30 jets at this time.  In the late 1970s, Hawaiian operated larger McDonnell Douglas DC-9-50 jets on its inter-island flights.

By early 1985, United Airlines was operating nonstop service into the airport from both Los Angeles and San Francisco with Douglas DC-8-71 and wide-body McDonnell Douglas DC-10 jetliners.

In 1991, a small museum, the Astronaut Ellison S. Onizuka Space Center opened at the airport. The displays included a sample of lunar soil, a spacesuit from Apollo 13, and personal items from Onizuka.

The longer runways enabled much larger aircraft to use the airport, enabling nonstop flights between Kona and Tokyo or destinations in the United States beyond the West Coast hubs.

Japan Airlines (JAL) started a Kona-Tokyo flight in 1996. The route was suspended between 2010 and September 2017 leaving the island with only one scheduled international flight (to Vancouver) for a time. Hawaiian Airlines filed an application with the US Department of Transportation (USDOT) for nonstop flights from Kona to Tokyo's Haneda Airport, to restore the link between the two cities after JAL ended flights to Narita Airport in 2010. The USDOT rejected the airline's application in favor of Delta's Seattle to Haneda flights despite support from residents of west Hawaii. On October 23, 2013, Hawaiian Airlines announced that they would re-apply to the USDOT for nonstop Kona-Haneda flights a year after their application to fly that route was rejected.  On July 8, 2016, Hawaiian Airlines announced that nonstop Kona-Haneda flights would begin on December 20, 2016, after the USDOT awarded them the route in May. JAL's resumption of daily Tokyo service in 2017 generated 900 jobs and $8.58 million in tax revenue for the Big Island during its first year, according to the Hawaiian Tourism Authority. Tokyo service on both Hawaiian and JAL was suspended during the COVID-19 pandemic, during which time a new international arrivals facility was built at Kona; JAL resumed its Narita-Kona route in August 2022.

A modernization project started in March 2017 to combine the airport's two separate terminals into one terminal area. The program allowed the airport to have one, central security screening area and also allowed passengers to use the shopping and dining areas in either terminal. To enable the expansion, the Onizuka Space Center was closed in March 2016, and instead, the airport was renamed after Onizuka in January 2017.

Facilities and aircraft

It has one asphalt runway, 17/35, 11,000 by 150 feet (3,353 x 46 m).

In the year ending November 30, 2021 the airport had 87,770 aircraft operations, an average of 240 per day: 51% general aviation, 30% scheduled commercial, 12% air taxi and 7% military. In March 2022, there were 56 aircraft based at this airport; 26 single-engine, 8 multi-engine, 18 helicopters and 4 ultralights.

Passenger terminal 
The state government of Hawaii facility operates a runway and a terminal complex of single-story buildings along the eastern edge of the airfield for passengers, air cargo and mail, airport support, and general aviation. Airport operations fall under the State of Hawaii Department of Transportation.

The commercial passenger facility is a set of rambling, open-air, tropical-style structures, divided into three terminals: Terminal 1 includes gates 1 through 5, Terminal 2 includes gates 6 through 10, and Terminal 3 hosts smaller commuter flights. Kona International is the only remaining major airport in the Hawaiian Islands where passengers board using mobile stairs or ramps, instead of more modern jet bridges. Despite the less modern facilities, Kona is used by large airliners including the Airbus A321 and A330 along with the Boeing 717, 737, 757, 767, and 777.

Airlines and destinations

Passenger

Cargo

Statistics

Passenger numbers

Airline market share

Top destinations

Accidents and incidents
 On August 25, 1977, an Air Cargo Hawaii twin-turboprop Short SC.7 Skyvan crashed and burned while attempting to land at Keahole Airport.  The pilot and passenger were killed.  The crash occurred about  short of the runway.
 On September 10, 1989, the pilot of an Aero Commander 680 was making an emergency landing on runway 17 due to loss of power in the right engine.
 On June 21, 2022, a Rockwell Commander 114 #N4888W suffered a landing gear failure while landing at the airport. As a result the sole runway was blocked for 3 hours, and all inbound flights were directed to OGG or HNL. The lone pilot was not injured.

References

External links

 Kona International Airport (KOA): Airport terminal map
 Hawaii DOT page for Kona International Airport at Keahole
 Astronaut Ellison S. Onizuka Space Center
 
 

Airports in Hawaii
Airports established in 1970
Buildings and structures in Hawaii County, Hawaii
Museums in Hawaii County, Hawaii
Biographical museums in Hawaii
Aerospace museums in Hawaii
Transportation in Hawaii County, Hawaii
1970 establishments in Hawaii
Kailua-Kona, Hawaii